Metathrinca is a genus of moths of the family Xyloryctidae.

Species
 Metathrinca ancistrias (Meyrick, 1906)
 Metathrinca argentea Wang, Zheng & Li, 2000
 Metathrinca ceromorpha (Meyrick, 1923)
 Metathrinca coenophyes Diakonoff, [1968]
 Metathrinca fopingensis Wang, Zheng & Li, 2000
 Metathrinca illuvialis (Meyrick, 1914)
 Metathrinca intacta (Meyrick, 1938)
 Metathrinca iridostoma Diakonoff, [1968]
 Metathrinca loranthivora (Meyrick, 1937)
 Metathrinca meihuashana Wang, Zheng & Li, 2000
 Metathrinca memnon Meyrick, 1914
 Metathrinca ophiura Meyrick, 1908
 Metathrinca parabola (Meyrick, 1914)
 Metathrinca pernivis Diakonoff, [1968]
 Metathrinca rosaria (Meyrick, 1907)
 Metathrinca sinumbra Diakonoff, [1968]
 Metathrinca tsugensis (Kearfott, 1910)

References

 
Xyloryctidae
Xyloryctidae genera